Florian Spalteholz (born 4 March 1977) is a German former sailor, who specialized in the multihull (Tornado) class. Together with his partner Johannes Polgar, he was named one of the country's top sailors in the mixed multihull catamaran for the 2008 Summer Olympics, finishing in eighth place. A member of North German Regatta Club, Spalteholz trained most of his competitive sailing career under the tutelage of his Norwegian-born personal coach Rigo de Nijs.

Spalteholz competed for the German sailing squad, as a 31-year-old skipper in the Tornado class, at the 2008 Summer Olympics in Beijing. Leading up to their maiden Games, he and skipper Polgar topped the selection criteria in a duel against brothers Tino and Niko Mittelmeier for the country's Tornado berth, based on their cumulative scores attained at two international regattas stipulated by the German Sailing Federation. The German duo started off the race series in the middle of the fleet until the shifty wind conditions propelled them to the front on the final half with a single victory and a triad of top-five marks, making both Spalteholz and Polgar eligible for the medal race. An unforeseen capsize by the German duo on the initial run, however, saw their medal chances vanish, plummeting them further to eighth overall with 74 net points.

References

External links
 
 
 
 

1977 births
Living people
German male sailors (sport)
Olympic sailors of Germany
Sailors at the 2008 Summer Olympics – Tornado
Sportspeople from Hamburg